Pacific Raceways is a mixed-use road racing and drag racing facility near Kent, Washington. The race track was constructed in 1959 and opened in 1960. The track was originally named Pacific Raceways, then became known as Seattle International Raceways in 1969. After the landowner regained control of the track in 2002, the name reverted to Pacific Raceways.

Pacific Raceways features a  road course which is used by the SCCA, Society of Vintage Racing Enthusiasts (SOVREN), and ICSCC for automobile road racing. The Washington Motorcycle Road Racing Association (WMRRA) uses the course for motorcycle road racing.

The track hosted two NASCAR Winston West Series between 1984 and 1985, won by Jim Bown and Dale Earnhardt respectively and also hosted a NASCAR Northwest Series race in 2003, won by Jeff Jefferson. 

Pacific Raceways hosts a performance driving school which offers several curricula, including sanctioned race licensing courses, performance driving, lapping clinics, and specialty driving instruction.

The facility also features a dragstrip, which hosts the NHRA Mello Yello Drag Racing Series Northwest Nationals and regional races, plus a dirt motocross track.

Since 1988, Pacific Raceways has been home to the Northwest Nationals (originally known as the Seafair Nationals) of the NHRA Drag Racing Series.

The track played an important role during the heyday of professional sports car racing in the U.S. during the 1960s. From 1963 through 1968, Pacific Raceways hosted the Pacific Northwest Grand Prix, which was a round of the United States Road Racing Championship. From 1967 through 1970, the venue hosted an annual round of the SCCA Trans-Am Series, including the season finales in 1967 and 1968. The Trans-Am Series returned to the track in 1975, 1977, and 1982 through 1984. The SCCA Continental Championship for Formula 5000 cars visited the track from 1969 through 1971, and again in 1973.

The track hosted a two heat race weekend of the USAC Championship Car series in 1969. The first heat was won by Mario Andretti and the second was won by Al Unser.

Among the other champion drivers who have visited victory lane at Pacific Raceways are Mark Donohue, Brian Redman, David Hobbs, Ronnie Bucknum, Peter Gregg, Tony Adamowicz, Parnelli Jones, Elliott Forbes-Robinson, Pedro Rodriguez, Dave MacDonald, Ken Miles, Jim Hall and Jerry Titus.

Lap records

The fastest official race lap records at Pacific Raceways (formerly known as Seattle International Raceways) are listed as:

See also
Jerry Ruth, NHRA world champion who frequently raced at Pacific Raceways

References

External links

Pacific Raceways
Pacific Raceways at Racing-Reference
Washington Motorcycle Road Racing Association (WMMRA)
Trackpedia guide to driving this track

NHRA Division 6 drag racing venues
NASCAR tracks
Motorsport venues in Washington (state)
Sports venues in Kent, Washington
Buildings and structures in King County, Washington
Tourist attractions in King County, Washington